Richard Marsh (died 1 May 1226), also called Richard de Marisco, served as Lord Chancellor of England and Bishop of Durham.

Early career

Marsh attended a university, as he was styled magister, but which university it was is unknown. His ancestry and upbringing likewise are unknown. He was a royal clerk and canon of Exeter Cathedral before becoming Archdeacon of Northumberland by 1 November 1211. He was also Archdeacon of Richmond. During that time he was also serving in the financial administration. In 1210 he earned a mention as one of the king's "evil counsellors."

Royal service
During 1212 Marsh held the office of Sheriff of Somerset and Dorset. Stephen Langton, the Archbishop of Canterbury, threatened Marsh with excommunication over Marsh's exactions from the Church during the interdict of John's reign. Marsh went to Rome in 1213, to negotiate on both his own behalf and on his king's behalf, and succeeded in getting much more lenient terms from the pope than had originally been given. He served as Chancellor from 29 October 1214 until his death in 1226. However, his title was mostly honorary after his election as a bishop in 1217, for he no longer attended court all the time, and Ralph Neville, who had custody of the king's seal, did most of the actual work of the office of chancellor.

Bishop
Marsh was elected Bishop of Durham about 27 June 1217 and consecrated probably on 2 July 1217. His election had been promoted by the papal legate, Guala Bicchieri, and his consecration was performed by Archbishop Walter de Gray of York at Gloucester.

In 1224, when Fawkes de Breauté kidnapped a royal justice and held him in Bedford Castle, Marsh voluntarily contributed to the carucage that had been voted by the clergy of the ecclesiastical province of Canterbury, even though he was a member of the province of York. This carucage was voted to help with the expenses of the siege and taking of Bedford Castle. Marsh continued the quarrel between the cathedral chapter and the bishops over the revenues and rights of the monks.

Death and legacy
Marsh died on 1 May 1226, quite suddenly at Peterborough Abbey while on his way to London for a hearing in the lawsuit between the monks and himself. His nephew, Adam Marsh, was his heir, and received his large library as a bequest.

Citations

References

 
 
 
 
  

Year of birth unknown
1226 deaths
Lord chancellors of England
Bishops of Durham
Archdeacons of Northumberland
Archdeacons of Richmond
13th-century English Roman Catholic bishops
High Sheriffs of Somerset
High Sheriffs of Dorset